Jaiba is a genus of moths in the family Saturniidae first described by Claude Lemaire, Nirton Tangerini and Olaf Hermann Hendrik Mielke in 1999.

Species
Jaiba kesselringi Lemaire, Tangerini & O. H. H. Mielke, 1999

References

Ceratocampinae